From March 7 to June 6, 1916, voters of the Democratic Party chose its nominee for president in the 1916 United States presidential election. Incumbent President Woodrow Wilson was selected as the nominee through a series of primary elections and caucuses culminating in the 1916 Democratic National Convention held from June 14 to June 16, 1916, in St. Louis, Missouri.

See also
1916 Republican Party presidential primaries
White primary

References